The 2005–06 Serie C1 was the twenty-eighth edition of Serie C1, the third highest league in the Italian football league system. It was divided into two phases: the regular season, played from 28 August 2005 to 7 May 2006, and the playoff phase. Once the regular season was over teams placed 2nd to 5th entered a playoff to determine the second team in each division to be promoted to Serie B. At the same time, teams placed 14th to 17th entered a playout for the right to remain in Serie C1 the following season.

As usual, Serie C1 was composed by two divisions, whose teams were divided geographically. Division C1/A was mainly composed by Northern Italy teams, with the exception of Salernitana, whereas Division C1/B included mostly Central and Southern Italy teams. The league featured also two former Italian national champions, Genoa and Napoli, both eventually achieving promotion in the end.

Teams finishing first in the regular season, plus one team winning the playoff round from each division were promoted to Serie B; teams finishing last in the regular season, plus two relegation playoff losers from each division were relegated to Serie C2.  In all, four teams were promoted to Serie B, and six teams were relegated to Serie C2.

Final standings

Serie C1/A

Serie C1/B

Promotion and relegation playoffs

Serie C1/A

Promotion
Promotion playoff semifinals
First legs played 28 May 2006; return legs played 4 June 2006

|}

Promotion playoff finals
First leg played 11 June 2006; return leg played 18 June 2006

|}

Genoa promoted to Serie B

Relegation
Relegation playoffs
First legs played May 21, 2006; return legs played May 28, 2006

|}
 
Pro Sesto and Lumezzane relegated to Serie C2

Serie C1/B

Promotion
Promotion playoff semifinals
First legs played May 21, 2006; return legs played May 28, 2006

|}

Promotion playoff finals
First leg played June 4, 2006; return leg played June 11, 2006

|}

Frosinone promoted to Serie B

Relegation
Relegation playoffs
First legs played 21 May 2006; return legs played 28 May 2006

|}

Acireale and Massese relegated to Serie C2

External links
Italy Third Level 2005/06 at RSSSF

Serie C1 seasons
Italy
3